The Veterans Memorial Elementary School, also known as Veterans Memorial STEM Academy, at 1200 Locust St., is a public elementary school in Reno, Nevada, operated by the Washoe County School District. It occupies a historic Moderne-style building dating from 1949 that was designed by Nevada architect Russell Mills.  It was listed on the National Register of Historic Places in 1995.
It was deemed significant "for its role in the local history of education" and "for its Art
Deco/Moderne style of architecture by a prominent local architect, Russell Mills."

Students zoned to Veterans Memorial are zoned to Vaughn Middle School and Earl Wooster High School.

References

External links
 Veterans Elementary

National Register of Historic Places in Reno, Nevada
Streamline Moderne architecture in the United States
School buildings completed in 1949
Schools in Reno, Nevada
School buildings on the National Register of Historic Places in Nevada
Public elementary schools in the United States
Public schools in Nevada
Washoe County School District